Dorotea Municipality is a municipality in Västerbotten County in northern Sweden. Its seat is located in Dorotea.

When the first local government acts were implemented in Sweden in 1863 Dorotea parish was made a rural municipality. In 1974 it was merged into Åsele Municipality. Already in 1980 it was split off, forming a new Dorotea Municipality. It is the third least populated municipality of Sweden.

Locality
There is only one locality (or urban area) in Dorotea Municipality:

Economy
Amongst the industries in the municipality is one of the biggest caravan manufacturers in Scandinavia, Polarvagnen, now known as SoliferPolar as it has merged with Solifer. Other known industries and companies are Dorocell, Svenska Tält and S-Karosser.

In more recent years, several IT-companies have also moved to the municipality. In early 2000 the company Spray was located here but then moved to Sollefteå. The large house which held the support department and other personnel was later taken over by Datakompisen.

Twinnings
 Haljala Parish, Estonia (since 1994)

References

External links

Dorotea Municipality - Official site 
Tourist office

Municipalities of Västerbotten County